Theo Duyvestijn (born ) is a Paralympian athlete from the Netherlands competing mainly in category TW2 track events.

Duyvestijn competed in two Paralympics firstly in 1988 where he competed as a 1C athlete in all the track races from 100m to 1500m winning a bronze medal in the 100m. His second games came in Barcelona in 1992 where he won the 1500m TW2 gold medal and the 400m TW2 silver medal as well as competing in the 200m and marathon.

References

External links
 

Living people
Paralympic athletes of the Netherlands
Athletes (track and field) at the 1988 Summer Paralympics
Athletes (track and field) at the 1992 Summer Paralympics
Paralympic gold medalists for the Netherlands
Paralympic silver medalists for the Netherlands
Paralympic bronze medalists for the Netherlands
Dutch male sprinters
Dutch male long-distance runners
Dutch male middle-distance runners
Medalists at the 1988 Summer Paralympics
Medalists at the 1992 Summer Paralympics
People from Westland (region), Netherlands
Year of birth uncertain
Place of birth missing (living people)
Paralympic medalists in athletics (track and field)
20th-century Dutch people
Dutch male wheelchair racers
Year of birth missing (living people)